Sangha (sometimes spelled Sanga) is a rural commune in the Cercle of Bandigara in the Mopti Region of Mali. The commune contains around 44 small villages and in the 2009 census had a population of 32,513. The administrative centre (chef-lieu) is the village of Sangha Ogol Leye, one of a cluster of at least 10 small villages at the top of the Bandiagara Escarpment.

The commune is known as a centre for Dogon traditional religion with many temples and shrines, and as a base for visitors to the local Dogon villages. Toro So is spoken in the village of Sangha. Most of the ethnographic work by Marcel Griaule was carried out among the Dogon of Sangha.

Gallery

See also
Binou
Lebe
Tellem
Toloy
Yaboyabo
Awa Society

References

External links
.
.

Communes of Mopti Region
Dogon holy places
Dogon history